Luk (stylised as Lюk) was a Ukrainian music band from Kharkiv. The band's style joins acid jazz, lounge and rock. In their texts musicians used mostly Ukrainian, Russian and French. 

Luk was formed in 1999. The name was given accidentally without special meaning (люк means manhole). After released four studio albums Luk declared its break up in 2011.

Luk collaborated with Kharkiv-based Ukrainian writer Serhiy Zhadan. Most of their Ukrainian-language songs were witten in lyrics of Zhadan (in particular the first album Tourist zone is based on Zhadan's play "Merry Christmas, Jesus Christ"). Also Luk recorded a lot of songs with 5'Nizza member Andriy Zaporozhets (in particular the second album is a result of collaboration with Zaporozhets). Their third album contains two songs recorded with other 5'Nizza musician Serhiy Babkin.

Members 
 Olha Gerasimova (vocal)
 Oleh Serdyuk (keyboards)
 Serhiy Belmas (bass)
 Velentyn Panyuta (guitar)
 Oleksandr Kratinov (drums)

Discography 
Albums
 Tourist zone (2002)
 Lemon (2004)
 Sex (2005)
 Мамина юность (Mamina Yunost, 2009)

Compilation
 The Best of Luk (2008)

Links 
 Official page 

Ukrainian rock music groups
Musical groups established in 1999
1999 establishments in Ukraine
Acid jazz ensembles
Musical groups from Kharkiv
Musical groups disestablished in 2011
2011 disestablishments in Ukraine